is a town located in Kushiro Subprefecture, Hokkaido, Japan.

As of September 30, 2016, it has an estimated population of 6,120 and an area of 427.68 km2.

History 
1906: Hamanaka Village is formed.
1963: Hamanaka Village becomes Hamanaka Town.

Climate

Notable people 
Monkey Punch (Japanese manga artist Kazuhiko Katō (加藤一彦 Katō Kazuhiko).

References

External links

Official Website  

 
Towns in Hokkaido